MTV is a Spanish pay television channel which focuses its programming on general entertainment and music. It was launched on 10 September 2000 and is owned by Paramount Global. It used to be available on the Spanish digital terrestrial television platform between 2010 and 2014, until it moved back to pay television due to a low audience figure.

The channel broadcasts from London, UK.

History

MTV España launched on September 10, 2000 with a selection of localised content and content from MTV Europe. The channel launched with localised versions of hit MTV shows (Hitlist España, MTV Select, MTV Hot). Upon launch the channel was made available to 100 per cent digital television viewers across Spain and the Canary Islands. MTV España was part of MTV Networks Southern Europe (MTV Italy and MTV France) often sharing similar on-air identities. By 2010 due to an agreement between ViacomCBS and Vocento on August 3, 2010, MTV began broadcasting in test signal within the national digital terrestrial.
On July 1, 2011, MTV Spain adapted its corporate image by removing the name "Music Television" under the logo and cutting it in half sharing a similar on-air identity to MTV's other global channels.
On January 31, 2014, it was announced that MTV would cease broadcasting in DTT on February 7 of the same year. While the channel returned exclusively to Canal+, in the rest of the paid operators the channel was replaced by another of the company or completely removed from its programming offer.
On April 7, 2014, the frequency where MTV broadcast disappeared due to the judgment of the Supreme Court of Justice, promoted by the Popular Party to annul the free broadcasting concessions for nine channels because they were granted without proper licenses. For this reason, MTV was not replaced by any other channel.
On February 20, 2015, the operator Movistar TV incorporated the channel into its programming grid.
Despite having relegated music to the background, MTV continues to broadcast music daily, with programming blocks such as "100% MTV", composed entirely of music videos from genres such as R&B, Hip-Hop, EDM, Rock, Indie, among others. In early June 2016, this block was renamed "MTV Insomnia". In addition, the channel broadcasts music on a block called "#MañanasMusicalesMTV" from morning to afternoon on weekends. Shortly after his return to Canal+, MTV begins broadcasting concerts again during central time.
After almost a year of exclusivity on Canal+, the channel joined Telecable on January 7, 2015, and on February 20 on Movistar TV. In this way, it continued to be part of Movistar+ after the merger of Canal+ and Movistar TV.
On December 1, 2015, the channel rejoined Vodafone TV's dial 37 after almost 2 years of having abandoned its channel offer.
On September 7, 2016, MTV Spain's high definition signal is launched exclusively for Vodafone TV and Telecable subscribers.
On September 17, 2018 MTV launched My MTV a customisable music television channel

Former Presenter(s)
 Johann Wald (Top20 MTV Hits, Top20 MTV Selection)
 Laura Hayden (Top20 MTV Hits, Top20 MTV Selection)
 Duo Kie (MTV Tuning España)
 Claudia González (Select MTV)
 Miguel Such (Select MTV)
 Artur Palomo Ramos (Select MTV)
 Deborah Ombres (MTV Hot)
 Guillem Caballé (MTV Kabuki, MTV Top 20 Spain)
 Mario Vaquerizo (MTV Video of the Year)
 Olvido Gara (MTV Video of the Year)

References

External links 
 http://www.mtv.es

MTV channels
Television stations in Spain
Spanish-language television stations
Television channels and stations established in 2000
2000 establishments in Spain
Music organisations based in Spain
Television in Andorra